The Sinking of Sozopol is a 2014 Bulgarian drama film directed by Kostadin Bonev starring Deyan Donkov, Snezhina Petrova, Svetla Yancheva and Stefan Valdobrev. A pre-premiere screening took place at the festival Apolonia in Sozopol on 29 August 2014. Additional screenings took place on 12 October 2014 during the 32nd Golden Rose Film Festival in Varna, and 13 November 2014 at the 28th Bulgarian film festival Cinemania. The film was officially released on 3 April 2015.

Plot
Aging architect Chavo (Deyan Donkov) arrives to Sozopol which is connected to the earlier part of his life.

He is determined to drink 10 bottles of vodka and to commit suicide. He meets his friends, thinks about his past and little by little the rain in Sozopol becomes stronger and stronger responding to his feelings.

Chavo shares his plans to commit suicide with his friend Doc (Stefan Valdobrev) who prescribes him anti-depressants.

The film reflects his complicated relationship with his oppressive artist father and the tragic destiny of his younger brother who ends up drowning.

Tension heightens in the film. The turmoil of nature reflects the loneliness of the architect and his feelings of guilt.

He thinks of his lost love Neva (Snezhina Petrova) and somehow expects a miracle after he drinks the tenth bottle of vodka. Because of her he left his wife Tanya and his children.

The structure of the film is non-linear, the past present and future are inter-connected and create a special atmosphere of ambiguity. The end of the film is unexpected and we find out that the friend Gina committed suicide by jumping into the sea.

Cast
 Deyan Donkov as Chavo
 Snezhina Petrova as Neva
 Svetla Yancheva as Gina
 Stefan Valdobrev as Doc
 Vassil Gurov as Ginji
 Veselin Mezekliev as Father
 Leonid Yovchev as Plamka
 Petya Silyanova as Mother
 Bilyana Kazakova as Nel
 Miroslava Gogovska as Tanichka
 André Chandelle as The Canadian 
 Joreta Nikolova as Denata
 Maria Simeonova as Gill

Production
The film was based on the novel of the same name by Ina Vultchanova published in 2007.
It was shot over five weeks in September and October 2013 in Sozopol, Ahtopol and Sinemorets.

Accolades
In October 2014, The Sinking of Sozopol received two awards at the 32nd Golden Rose Bulgarian Feature Film Festival in Varna; Best Actress award (Snejina Petrova) and Best Screenplay award (Ina Valchanova and Kostadin Bonev).

In May 2015 the film was nominated at the New York City International Film Festival in seven categories and won the award for the Best Foreign Film.

In July 2015 the film won an award Best Ensemble Cast at the Milano International Film Festival Awards.

In June 2015 the film won awards from the Bulgarian Film Academy in four categories.

In August 2016 the film won three awards at the Prague Independent Film Festival including the Grand Prix — Golden Eagle, Best Director for Kostadin Bonev and Best Cinematography for Konstantin Zankov.

In September 2016 at the International Film Festival in Brasov the movie won the 'best film award'.

References

External links

2014 films
2014 drama films
Bulgarian drama films